Sahaspur Legislative Assembly constituency is one of the seventy electoral Uttarakhand Legislative Assembly constituencies of Uttarakhand state in India. It includes Dehradun Cantonment area. This seat is a part of Tehri Garhwal (Lok Sabha constituency).

Members of the Legislative Assembly

Election results

2022

References

External link
  

Politics of Dehradun
Assembly constituencies of Uttarakhand
2002 establishments in Uttarakhand
Constituencies established in 2002